Thomas Kral (born 8 January 1990) is an Austrian footballer who plays for Nußdorfer AC.

References

Austrian footballers
Austrian Football Bundesliga players
1990 births
Living people
Association football defenders
SV Wienerberger players
SC Wiener Neustadt players
Wiener Sport-Club players